The Governess is a 1958 television play broadcast by the Australian Broadcasting Corporation based on a play by Patrick Hamilton, which had been performed several times on Australian radio. It was directed by William Sterling who had previously directed an adaptation of Hamilton's Gaslight (1958).

Plot
The Victorian governess of a family comes under suspicion when the baby son disappears.

Cast
Patricia Kennedy  as the governess
Carole Potter as Ellen Drew, the daughter of the house
Brian James
John Morgan 
Mary Disney
Sydney Conabere
Lesley Pope
Muriel Hearne
Nevil Thurgood
Charmain Jacka

Production
It was the first in a series of "live" dramas to be broadcast every fortnight on Sunday night on ABV-2. (Either broadcast live in Melbourne or telerecordings of plays originally broadcast live in Sydney.) This was in response to criticism of viewers of "old American and British films". Mr Ewart Chapple, Victorian manager of the ABC, said when announcing the policy that ""We have complete faith in local artists and in their ability to provide entertainment of world standard."

It was followed by The Last Call, The Rose without a Thorn, The Lark, Citizen of Westminster, and Enemy of the People (the last of "the season").

The advertisement for the show made nationalistic appeals saying "do you really want to encourage talented local young artists" and "we're doing our part - you can tell by tuning in."

The play was the TV debut of Carole Potter, a 15-year-old school girl.

See also
List of live television plays broadcast on Australian Broadcasting Corporation (1950s)

References

External links
The Governess at IMDb

Australian television plays
Australian Broadcasting Corporation original programming
English-language television shows
Australian live television shows
Black-and-white Australian television shows
1958 television plays
Films directed by William Sterling (director)